is a passenger railway station located in the city of Yoshinogawa, Tokushima Prefecture, Japan. It is operated by JR Shikoku and has the station number "B11".

Lines

Layout
The station consists of a side platform and an island platform serving 3 tracks. The station building has been unstaffed since 2010 and serves only as a waiting room. Access to the island platform is by means of a footbridge.

Platforms

Adjacent stations

History
When the company was nationalized on 1 September 1907, Japanese Government Railways (JGR) took over control of the station and operated it as part of the Tokushima Line (later the Tokushima Main Line). On 25 March 1914 it was renamed . On 1 July 1915 it was renamed Awa-Kawashima. With the privatization of Japanese National Railways (JNR), the successor of JGR, on 1 April 1987, the station came under the control of JR Shikoku. On 1 June 1988, the line was renamed the Tokushima Line.

Passenger statistics
In fiscal 2014, the station was used by an average of 490 passengers daily.

Surrounding area
Kawashima Shrine
Kawashima Castle
Tokushima Agricultural Administration Office Area 2nd Section Government Building
Yoshinogawa City Chamber of Commerce and Industry Kawashima Kaikan

See also
 List of Railway Stations in Japan

References

External links

 JR Shikoku timetable

Railway stations in Tokushima Prefecture
Railway stations in Japan opened in 1899
Yoshinogawa, Tokushima